Beharovce is a small village and municipality in the Levoča District, Prešov Region.

History
In historical records the village was first mentioned in 1338.

Geography
The municipality lies at an altitude of 474 metres and covers an area of  (2020-06-30/-07-01). The village is few kilometres away from the Branisko tunnel.

Genealogical resources

The records for genealogical research are available at the state archive "Statny Archiv in Levoca, Slovakia"

 Roman Catholic church records (births/marriages/deaths): 1760-1948 (parish B)

See also
 List of municipalities and towns in Slovakia

References

External links
https://web.archive.org/web/20070427022352/http://www.statistics.sk/mosmis/eng/run.html
Surnames of living people in Beharovce

Villages and municipalities in Levoča District
Spiš